Adele is an unincorporated community in Morgan County, in the U.S. state of Kentucky.

History
The community's name is an amalgamation of Helen Chase Walbridge, the daughter of a railroad official.

References

Unincorporated communities in Morgan County, Kentucky
Unincorporated communities in Kentucky